Jannie Visscher (born 8 November 1961) is a Dutch politician for the Socialist Party (SP). From 2006 to 2014 she was alderman of Groningen. From 2014 to 2018 she was alderman in Eindhoven. Since December 2019 she has been party chairman of the SP.

Biography
She studied agricultural environmental science at the Rijks Hogere Landbouwschool in Groningen. In 2006 she became alderman in that city on behalf of the SP for health care, the elderly, and urban management and environment. After the 2010 municipal elections, she was given the portfolios of welfare and health care, the elderly, waste management, urban management, ecology and animal welfare, recreation, and integration and emancipation.

In May 2014 she became alderman in the municipality of Eindhoven with the portfolios youth, education, special education, housing of educational institutions, traffic, transport and mobility.

In the 2018 municipal elections, Visscher was elected as a councilor in the municipality of Eindhoven.

In the 2019 European Parliament election, Visscher was placed second on the SP's list of candidates, which was not enough to be elected. Shortly afterwards she applied for the vacant position of national party chairman. During the party congress on 14 December 2019, she was elected party chairman of the Socialist Party.

References

1961 births
Living people
21st-century Dutch politicians
21st-century Dutch women politicians
Aldermen in North Brabant
Aldermen of Groningen
Chairmen of the Socialist Party (Netherlands)
Municipal councillors of Eindhoven
People from Dedemsvaart
Socialist Party (Netherlands) politicians